Lamproplax is a genus of true bugs belonging to the family Rhyparochromidae.

The species of this genus are found in Europe.

Species:
 Lamproplax majuscula Kerzhner, 1977
 Lamproplax membraneus Distant, 1883
 Lamproplax piceus (Flor, 1860)
 Lamproplax unispina Kerzhner, 1977

References

Rhyparochromidae